"Fine" is a song by American singer Whitney Houston, and was released as the fourth single from her 2000 compilation album, Whitney: The Greatest Hits, in September 2000.

Composition 

"Fine" is a mid-tempo R&B tune, written and produced by Raphael Saadiq and Kamaal Fareed. According to Billboard, it features "languid retro-funk guitars" and a "sneaky hook", brought to life by "richly layered harmonies". It was described as having "a sleek lite-funk sound" by The Star-Ledger.

Critical reception 
Billboard wrote that "Fine" is "perhaps her most convincing crack at urbanized pop music to date. [Houston] seems to have eased into the chilled soul that propels a street-wise track. She wisely does not give into the temptation to belt and wail her way through the song [...]. Instead, Houston works the more sultry lower register of her voice, saving the big, beautiful notes as a dramatic accent toward the end of the cut". LA Weekly in its review for Whitney: The Greatest Hits wrote that "Only on the stellar R&B track “Fine” does Whitney stand out. [...] “Fine” is soulful, funky and tight as hell. And the vocal performance ranks among Whitney’s best." The Baltimore Sun wrote that "Of the new tracks [on Whitney: The Greatest Hits], only the sultry, soulful "Fine" manages to convey any of the strengths that made Houston a star." and "hearing [Houston] work the tune's insistent, retro-funk groove, there's no doubting that she still has what it takes to make hits". CANOE reviewer Jane Stevenson felt that the song "falls flat". The Star-Ledger wrote that the song "grows tiresomely repetitious". According to New Nation the song takes Houston "to even greater heights, changing [her] vocals to a much lower tone, with an added hip-hop bassline". The St. Louis Post-Dispatch called it "a wonderful composition".

Chart performance 
"Fine" appeared on the singles charts only in the United States and in Sweden. The song peaked at number 51 on the US Billboard Hot R&B/Hip-Hop Singles & Tracks chart. In Sweden, it debuted and peaked at number 50, but spent only one week on the chart.

Music video 
The music video, directed by Kevin Bray, features Houston at a rooftop cocktail party. In the US, a DVD single was released. It includes the videos for "Fine" and the Houston-George Michael duet "If I Told You That", plus behind-the-scenes footage from the "Fine" video shoot. Houston's then-husband Bobby Brown also appears in the video.

Track listings and formats
US CD Promo single
 "Fine" (Radio Mix) — 3:34
 "Fine" (Instrumental) — 3:34
 "Fine" (Call Out Hook) — 0:40

Europe CD Maxi single
 "Fine" (Album version) — 3:34
 "Love to Infinity Megamix" (Edit) — 5:17
 "Heartbreak Hotel (R.I.P. Mix) — 3:40
 "Love to Infinity Megamix" — 9:22

Europe CD single
 "Fine" (Radio Edit) — 3:34
 "Same Script, Different Cast" (Jonathan Peters Radio Edit) — 4:20
 "Same Script, Different Cast" (Friburn & Urik Cover Your Ears Mix) — 10:49
 "Fine" (Instrumental) — 3:34

Europe CD single card sleeve
 "Fine" (Album version) — 3:34
 "Love to Infinity Megamix" (Edit) — 5:17

DVD single
 "Fine" (video) 
 "If I Told You That" (video)
 Behind-the-scenes footage of the "Fine" video shoot

Personnel 

Credits
 Produced by Raphael Saadiq & Q-Tip for The Ummah
 Orchestra arranged by Raphael Saadiq & Charles Veal, Jr.
 Orchestra recorded by Gerry "The Gov" Brown at Capitol Studios, LA, CA
 Orchestra conducted by Charles Veal, Jr. & performed by The South Central Chamber Orchestra
 Vocal Arrangement: Whitney Houston

Recording and mixing
 Recorded by Jason Stasium & Danny Romero at The Record Plant, LA, CA
 Mixed by DJ Quik at Skip Saylor Studios, LA, CA

Charts

Release history

References

External links 
 Fine at Discogs

Whitney Houston songs
2000 songs
2000 singles
Arista Records singles
Song recordings produced by Q-Tip (musician)
Song recordings produced by Raphael Saadiq
Songs written by Q-Tip (musician)
Songs written by Raphael Saadiq